Bang Chak or Bangchak may refer to:

The Thai name :
Bangchak Corporation, a Thai energy company
Bang Chak, Phra Khanong, a subdistrict of Phra Khanong District in Bangkok's east side and the company's namesake
Bang Chak BTS station, which serves the area
Bang Chak, Phasi Charoen, a subdistrict of Phasi Charoen District in Bangkok's west side
Bang Chak Subdistrict in Mueang Nakhon Si Thammarat District
Bang Chak Subdistrict in Mueang Phetchaburi District
Bang Chak railway station, which serves the area
Bang Chak Subdistrict in Phra Pradaeng District, Samut Prakan

The Thai name :
Bang Chak Subdistrict in Wiset Chai Chan District, Ang Thong